The 1951 Ice Hockey World Championships was the 18th World Championship and the 29th European Championship in ice hockey for international teams. The tournament took place in France from 9 to 17 March and the games were played in the capital city, Paris. Thirteen nations took part, and were first split into two groups. The seven best teams were placed in the first group, and the six others were placed into the "Criterium Européen", which would later become the B Pool. Each group was played in a round robin format, with each team playing each other once.

Canada, represented by the Lethbridge Maple Leafs, became world champions for the 14th time.  Highest ranking European team Sweden finished second, winning their fifth European Championship, finishing ahead of the Swiss on goal differential by three.

This tournament would be the last time France hosted the elite division of the World Championships until 2017, when Paris co-hosted the championship alongside Cologne in Germany.

World Championship Group A (France)

Table

Critérium européen – Junior European Championship (World Championship Group B) (France)

Table

World Championship medals

European Championship medals

Citations

References
Complete results

IIHF Men's World Ice Hockey Championships
World Ice Hockey Championships, 1951
International ice hockey competitions hosted by France
Ice Hockey World Championships
International sports competitions hosted by Paris
Ice Hockey World Championships